Gotor is a municipality located in the Aranda Comarca province of Zaragoza, Aragon, Spain. According to the 2004 census (INE), the municipality has a population of 389 inhabitants.

References

External links 

Comarca del Aranda official site

Municipalities in the Province of Zaragoza